Winifred Shirley Hughes  (16 July 1927 – 25 February 2022) was an English author and illustrator. She  wrote more than fifty books, which have sold more than 11.5 million copies, and  illustrated more than two hundred. As of 2007, she lived in London.

Hughes won the 1977 and 2003 Kate Greenaway Medals for British children's book illustration. In 2007, her 1977 winner, Dogger, was named the public's favourite winning work of the award's first fifty years. She won the inaugural BookTrust lifetime achievement award in 2015. She was a recipient of the Eleanor Farjeon Award. She was a patron of the Association of Illustrators.

Early life 
Hughes was born in West Kirby, then in the county of Cheshire (now in Merseyside), on 16 July 1927.  The daughter of Thomas James Hughes, owner of the Liverpool-based store chain T. J. Hughes and his wife Kathleen (née Dowling), she grew up in West Kirby on the Wirral.  She recalled being inspired from childhood by artists like Arthur Rackham and W. Heath Robinson, and later by the cinema and the Walker Art Gallery. Particular favourites of hers were Edward Ardizzone, and EH Shepard who illustrated Wind in the Willows and Winnie-the-Pooh. 

She enjoyed frequent visits to the theatre with her mother, which gave her a love for observing people and a desire to create.

She was educated at West Kirby Grammar School, but Hughes said she was not a particularly good student academically, and when she was 17, she left school to study drawing and costume design at the Liverpool School of Art.  In Liverpool she found that societal pressure was put on her to find a husband and then not achieve much with her life. She longed to escape from these claustrophobic expectations, so moved to Oxford in order to attend the Ruskin School of Drawing and Fine Art.

After art school she moved to Notting Hill, London. In 1952, she married John Sebastian Papendiek Vulliamy, an architect and etcher. They had three children together: the journalist Ed Vulliamy, the geneticist Tom Vulliamy, and Clara Vulliamy, who is also a children's book illustrator.

Career 

In Oxford, Hughes was encouraged to work in the picture book format and make lithographic illustrations.  However, after graduating she attempted to pursue her ambitions of becoming a theatre designer, and took a job at the Birmingham Rep Theatre. She quickly decided that the "enclosed hothouse" of the theatre world wasn't for her, so followed her former tutor's advice and started working as an illustrator. She began by  illustrating the books of other authors, including My Naughty Little Sister by Dorothy Edwards and The Bell Family by Noel Streatfeild. The first published book she both wrote and illustrated was Lucy & Tom's Day, which was made into a series of stories. She went on to write over fifty more stories, including Dogger (1977), the Alfie series (1977), featuring a young boy named Alfie and sometimes his sister Annie-Rose, and the Olly and Me series (1993). The Walker Art Gallery in her hometown of Liverpool hosted an exhibition of her work in 2003, which then moved to the Ashmolean Museum in Oxford.

Her most famous book, Dogger, is about a toy dog who is lost by a small boy, but is then reunited with his owner after being found in a jumble sale. This book was inspired by her son, Ed, who lost his favourite teddy in Holland Park. A real Dogger also existed, and was on display along with the rest of her work at her exhibition in London and Oxford.

Hughes illustrated 200 children's books throughout her career, which sold more than 10 million copies. In WorldCat participating libraries, eight of her ten most widely held works were Alfie books (1981 to 2002).  The others were Dogger (rank second) and Out and About (1988). Hughes wrote her first novel in 2015, a young-adult book titled Hero on a Bicycle. She was 84 years of age when she wrote this.

Hughes died on 25 February 2022 at her home in London. She was 94, and suffered from a brief illness prior to her death. She was paid tribute to by the UK's largest children's reading charity, the BookTrust, who said they were "devastated" by her death and that her "incredible stories and illustrations, from Dogger to Alfie and Lucy and Tom, have touched so many generations and are still so loved. Thank you, Shirley.” Michael Morpurgo, author of War Horse, praised her, noting that she "began the reading lives of so many millions."

Awards 
Dogger (1977), which she wrote and illustrated, was the first story by Hughes to be widely published abroad and it was recognised by the Library Association's Kate Greenaway Medal as the year's best children's book illustration by a British subject. In celebration of the 70th anniversary of the companion Carnegie Medal in 2007, it named one of the top ten Greenaway Medal-winning works by an expert panel and then named the public favourite, or "Greenaway of Greenaways". (The public voted on the panel's shortlist of ten, selected from the 53 winning works 1955 to 2005. Hughes and Dogger polled 26% of the vote to 25% for its successor as medalist, Janet Ahlberg and Each Peach Pear Plum.)

Hughes won a second Greenaway (no illustrator has won three) for Ella's Big Chance (2003), her own adaptation of Cinderella, set in the 1920s. It was published in the U.S. as Ella's Big Chance: A Jazz-Age Cinderella (Simon & Schuster, 2004). She was also a three-time Greenaway commended runner up: for Flutes and Cymbals: Poetry for the Young (1968), a collection compiled by Leonard Clark; for Helpers (Bodley Head, 1975), which she wrote and illustrated; and for The Lion and the Unicorn (Bodley Head, 1998), which she wrote and illustrated (Highly Commended).

In 1984, Hughes won the Eleanor Farjeon Award for distinguished service to children's literature, in 1999 she was awarded an OBE, and in 2000 she was made a Fellow of the Royal Society of Literature. She was also granted an Honorary Fellowship by Liverpool John Moores University and Honorary Degrees by the University of Liverpool in 2004 and the University of Chester in 2012.

Booktrust, the UK's largest reading charity, awarded Hughes their first lifetime achievement award in 2015.

Already Officer of the Order of the British Empire (OBE), Hughes was appointed Commander of the Order of the British Empire (CBE) in the 2017 New Year Honours for services to literature.

Works 
 Moving Molly 
 Bathwater's Hot 
 Noisy 
 When We Went to the Park 
 All Shapes and Sizes 
 Colours 
 Two Shoes, New Shoes 
 The Snow Lady. 
 Out and About 
 Dogger 
 Lucy and Tom's Christmas 
 Lucy and Tom at the Seaside 
 Tales of Trotter Street 
 Hero on a Bicycle 
 The Christmas Eve Ghost 
 The Lion and the Unicorn 
 Helpers 
 Angel Mae 
 Dogger's Christmas

Alfie stories 
 Alfie Gets in First 
 Alfie Gives a Hand 
 Alfie Wins a Prize 
 Alfie's Feet 
 Alfie's Weather 
 An Evening at Alfie's 
 The Big Alfie and Annie Rose Story Book 
 Rhymes for Annie Rose

Works by other authors, illustrated by Hughes 

 Rust, Doris, All Sorts of Days: Six Stories for the Very Young (Faber and Faber, 1955)
 Corrin, Sara and Stephen, Stories for Eight-Year-Olds (Faber and Faber, 1974)

Notes

References

Further reading
 "Shirley Hughes", in Books For Keeps (1984 May), pp. 14–15
 Kate Moody, "A Is for Artists", in Contact (1984 Spring), pp. 24–25
 Shirley Hughes, "Word and Image", in M. Fearn, ed., Only the Best is Good Enough: the Woodfield Lectures 1978–85 (1985)
 Elaine Moss, Part of the Pattern (1986), pp. 107–12
 D. Martin. "Shirley Hughes", in Douglas Martin, The Telling Line: Essays on Fifteen Contemporary Book Illustrators (Julia MacRae Books, 1989), pp. 148–66
 Shirley Hughes, A Life Drawing (The Bodley Head, 2002)

External links

 
 Julia Eccleshare, Shirley Hughes obituary, The Guardian, 2 March 2022
  —immediately, first edition 
  —immediately, first US edition 
 

1927 births
2022 deaths
Alumni of the Ruskin School of Art
Commanders of the Order of the British Empire
english children's book illustrators
English children's writers
English illustrators
Fellows of the Royal Society of Literature
Kate Greenaway Medal winners
People educated at West Kirby Grammar School
People from West Kirby
Vulliamy family
Writers who illustrated their own writing